The I. Polavaram mandal is one of the 22 mandals in Konaseema district of Andhra Pradesh. As per census 2011, there are 11 villages in this mandal.

Demographics 
The I. Polavaram mandal has a total population of 67,434 as per the Census 2011, out of which 33,977 are males and 33,457 are females. The average sex ratio is 985. The total literacy rate is 69%.

Towns and villages

Villages 
1. Bhairavapalem
2. G.Moolapolam
3. G Vemavaram
4. Guttenadeevi
5. Gogullanka
6. I. Polavaram
7. Kesanakurru
8. Komaragiri
9. Muramalla
10. Pasuvullanka
11. Patha Injaram
12. T. Kothapalle
13. Thillakkuppa
14. Yedurulanka

See also 
List of mandals of Andhra Pradesh

References 

Mandals in Konaseema district